Intel Ireland's parent company – the giant U.S.-based Intel microprocessor business – is a public company trading on the NASDAQ exchange. The manufacturing plant manufactured its first chip in 1993. To base its European operations in Ireland, Intel received over IRE£87m in grants from IDA Ireland. Intel Ireland also operates a research facility (Intel Shannon) in Shannon, County Clare which employs approximately 250 people. Since 1989, Intel has invested $15 billion, turning 360 acres of the Collinstown Industrial Park into the most advanced industrial campus in Europe.

Intel Ireland has approximately 4,500 employees working at its Leixlip campus as of 2020, and as it has been a major contributor to the performance of the Irish economy.  Construction of the Fab 24 manufacturing plant in the 2000s signified its continuing commitment to developing its Irish operations.

The Intel Ireland campus at Leixlip is Intel's largest manufacturing plant outside of the United States and consisted of two semi-conductor wafer fabrication facilities: Fab 10 Ireland Fab Operations (IFO), and also the Fab 24 manufacturing plant which includes Fab 24-2. IFO was a 200mm wafer facility whilst Fab 24 processes 300mm wafers using 65-nanometer and 90-nanometer process technologies. IFO ceased operations and Fab 10 is now classed as Fab 24, along with Fab 14. The Leixlip facility now only produces 300mm wafers using 14 nm technology.

In April 2005, the operation announced that the one-billionth microchip had been manufactured by the Leixlip-based operation . By August 2010, Intel Fab Operations (IFO) had become the first Intel plant to ship 2 billion die. It is also notable as the only Intel facility to achieve the ISO 14001 safety standard for its management of the local environment .
Intel Ireland has been located in County Kildare since 1989. The company has invested over $7 billion transforming the 360-acre former stud farm into a manufacturing centre. This site was chosen as it was ideal for the further expansion of the plant.

See also
List of Irish companies

References

External links 
IDA Profile of Intel Ireland

Irish companies established in 1989
Technology companies established in 1989
Technology companies of the Republic of Ireland
Intel